Paul Rowley Atterbury, FRSA (born 8 April 1945) is a British antiques expert, known for his many appearances since 1979 on the BBC TV programme Antiques Roadshow. He specialises in the art, architecture, design and decorative arts of the 19th and 20th centuries.

Biography
He is the oldest son of Rowley Atterbury and puppeteer Audrey Atterbury (née Holman), who worked on the 1950s children's Watch With Mother programme Andy Pandy for the BBC and who, it is claimed, based the character's appearance on that of her son. 

He was educated at Westminster School and the University of East Anglia (BA, 1972). Originally training as a graphic designer, he later went on to work for Sotheby Publications. He became an historical advisor for Royal Doulton and was the editor of Connoisseur magazine from 1980 to 1981. 

Since 1981, Atterbury has been a freelance writer, lecturer, broadcaster and exhibition curator. He most frequently curates for the Victoria and Albert Museum in London, his exhibitions there including "Pugin: a Gothic Passion" (1994) and "Inventing New Britain: the Victorian Vision" (2001).

Atterbury has written or edited over 30 books, mostly on ceramics. He has published books of old postcards showing Eype and West Bay, two Dorset villages. He is also known for his travel writing, and has written books on railways and canals. When British Waterways commissioned Robert Nicholson Publications to produce a series of guides to their waterways in the early 1970s, Atterbury and Andrew Darwin were supplied with a chartered boat and a student to drive it, in which they toured the canal network, producing the material for what became the first edition of the Nicholson Guides.

Until 2003, Atterbury was chairman of the Little Angel Theatre puppet theatre in Islington, north London. He has toured the country with his stage show 'Have You Had it Long Madam?' with fellow Antiques Roadshow expert Hilary Kay; the show visited Australia in 2009.

In 2007, Atterbury appeared on Channel 4's archaeology series Time Team talking about Augustus Pugin, and in 2009 he narrated BBC Four's documentary The Last Days of the Liners which examined how, in the years following World War II, countries competed to launch the most magnificent passenger ships on the great ocean routes. He is a Fellow of the Royal Society of Arts. 

The 1978 rescue of the Gilbert Bayes Doulton House Frieze during demolition of the former Royal Doulton Pottery premises in the Albert Embankment, Lambeth, was only made possible by the efforts of Atterbury.

Atterbury is the owner of the only remaining Teddy puppet from the television series Andy Pandy, that is not kept as part of a museum collection, which was a gift to his mother.

He lives in Weymouth in Dorset with his second wife, Chrissie, whom he married in 2002.

Selected publications
 1994: Pugin: a Gothic Passion. New Haven: Yale University Press (as co-editor) 
 2001: Victorians at Home and Abroad. London: V & A Publications.  (With Suzanne Fagence Cooper)
 2002: Poole Pottery: Carter and Co. and Their Successors 1873–2002. Richard Dennis 
 2006: Branch Line Britain: A Nostalgic Journey Celebrating a Golden Age. Newton Abbot: David & Charles (2006)   
 2007: Along Lost Lines. Newton Abbot: David & Charles 
 2007: Victorian House Style Handbook. Newton Abbot: David & Charles  (as editor)
 2008: Tickets Please: A Nostalgic Journey Through Railway Station Life. Newton Abbot: David & Charles 
 2008: Moorcroft: a Guide to Moorcroft Pottery 1897–1993. Richard Dennis 
 2009: All Change! (AA Illustrated Reference). Automobile Association 
 2013: Mapping Britain's Lost Branch Lines. David & Charles

References

External links

Atterbury on Easy Speak
Atterbury on Chateaucoye.com
Atterbury on PBS.org

1945 births
Living people
People educated at Westminster School, London
Alumni of the University of East Anglia
Antiques experts
English television presenters